Atakum Olympic Swimming Pool is an indoor Olympic-size swimming pool in Atakum district of Samsun province, northern Turkey.

The venue is situated in Yenimahalle Maha., Atatürk Boulevard Yanyolu 13, Atakum. It was opened in presence of Minister of Youth and Sports Akif Çağatay Kılıç on October 19, 2015. Built on a land covering , it cost around 20 million (approx. US$ 7.0). The main pool has ten lanes and the warm-up pool six lanes. The facility features also a fitness hall and a spa. It has a seating capacity for 1,000 spectators, including 100 for VIP, 100 for media members, 100 for accredited sportspeople and 100 for physically handicapped people.

International events hosted
The venue will host swimming events of the 2017 Summer Deaflympics.

References

Sports venues in Samsun
Swimming venues in Turkey
Indoor arenas in Turkey
Sports venues completed in 2015
2015 establishments in Turkey
Atakum